Premature is a 2014 American comedy film directed by Dan Beers, written by Beers and Mathew Harawitz. The film stars John Karna, Katie Findlay, Craig Roberts, Carlson Young, Adam Riegler, and Alan Tudyk.

It was produced by Karen Lunder and Aaron Ryder, with music by Nick Urata, cinematography by Jimmy Lindsey and editing by Robert Nassau. The film is Beers' directorial debut.

Plot
Rob Crabbe is a regular, awkward high school student. On a particular day, Rob has a college-entrance interview that could change his life. As Rob wakes up from a wet dream, his mother walks into his room and asks Rob to clean his linens after she sees them stained obviously with semen. The interview is for admittance to Georgetown University (the alma mater of Rob's parents) and during the interview Jack Roth (the interviewer) bursts into tears because his wife recently died. A number of events, such as Rob's crotch being hit by another student with a water pistol and a minor bicycle/auto incident, occur to further mess up Rob's day.

An attractive classmate, Angela, gives Rob the impression that she wants to sleep with him. He visits Angela, the two kiss, and when Angela puts her hand in Rob's pants, he ejaculates prematurely and wakes up in his room, just at the same moment that his mother walks in on him. The day begins again. At first, Rob believes it all to be a dream, but after experiencing the same day several times, ending with his ejaculation, he realizes that it's not a dream. Rob then attempts to make the day different. He drives a golf cart through the school, smokes pot with his friend Gabrielle in the school bus, touches a teacher's breasts and tries to damage the water pistol, but none of it results in him escaping the time loop.

Rob eventually realizes that he's in love with Gabrielle and goes to her place to confess his feelings. Gabrielle returns his affection and the two decide to have sex. Again, Rob has a premature ejaculation, but this time he does not wake up in his room, but continues to be with Gabrielle. He realizes that he has finally broken the time loop.

Cast
 John Karna as Rob Crabbe - student
 Katie Findlay as Gabrielle - Rob's love interest, friend and student
 Craig Roberts as Stanley - Rob's best friend and student
 Carlson Young as Angela "After School Special" Yearwood
 Adam Riegler as Arthur - smart kid and student
 Alan Tudyk as Jack Roth - Georgetown College recruiter
 Brian Huskey as Principal Hansen
 Celeste Finn as Ms. Marconi
 Jonathan Kleitman as Uzy - Rob's bully and student
 Steve Coulter as Jim Crabbe - Rob's father
 Kate Kneeland as Anne Crabbe - Rob's mother
 Zoe Myers as Lisa

Critical reception
The film-critics aggregator Rotten Tomatoes reports a rating of 48% based on 21 reviews, with a weighted average score of 5/10. At the review aggregator Metacritic, the film has a normalized score of 34%, based on nine critics, indicating "generally unfavorable reviews".

See also
 List of films featuring time loops

References

External links
 
 
 
  (rating 2/5)

2014 films
American comedy films
2014 comedy films
Films shot in Georgia (U.S. state)
Time loop films
2014 directorial debut films
2010s English-language films
2010s American films